Gilead is an unincorporated community in Lewis County, in the U.S. state of Missouri.

History
A post office called Gilead was established in 1854, and remained in operation until 1905. The community was named after a nearby Missionary Baptist church of the same name.

References

Unincorporated communities in Lewis County, Missouri
Unincorporated communities in Missouri